Angus McKie (born July 1951) is a British artist who has worked as a colourist in the comics industry.

He is best known as an English science fiction illustrator whose work appeared on the covers of numerous science fiction paperback novels in the mid-1970s and 1980s, as well as in Stewart Cowley's Terran Trade Authority series of illustrated books. His illustrations often present highly detailed spacecraft against vividly colored backgrounds and high-tech constructions as demonstrated by his pioneering work on The Dome: Ground Zero for DC Comics imprint Helix in 1998. Like Peter Elson, Tony Roberts, Chris Foss and some other artists of the period, he influenced an entire generation of science fiction illustrators and concept artists. This influence may be seen in the look of for the Homeworld video game.

In 1993 he wrote and drew the first 2 parts of a science fiction comic published by Dark Horse entitled "The Blue Lily", based on Dave Weir's short story. As of 2011, McKie was reportedly working on the last 2 parts of the work in his spare time. He also wrote and illustrated a story entitled "So Beautiful and So Dangerous" for Heavy Metal magazine, which later became a segment in the film Heavy Metal.

References

 2000 AD profile
 The Return Of Angus McKie’s Blue Lily

External links

English illustrators
Science fiction artists
British speculative fiction artists
Living people
Eisner Award winners for Best Coloring
1951 births
Artists from Newcastle upon Tyne